The River Lees is a stream in Fresh Creek, Andros Island, The Bahamas.

See also
List of rivers of the Bahamas

References

Rivers of the Bahamas